Tochuina nigromaculata is a species of dendronotid nudibranch. It is a marine gastropod mollusc in the family Tritoniidae.

Taxonomy
Originally described as a Tritonia this species was moved to the revised genus, Tochuina, in 2020 as a result of an integrative study of the family Tritoniidae.

Distribution
Tochuina nigromaculata was described from the Okhotsk Sea. It is a deep water species.

References

Tritoniidae
Gastropods described in 1984